Alexandros Tabakis (born 8 December 1992), also known as Alex Tambakis, is a Greek professional footballer who plays as a goalkeeper for USL Championship side New Mexico United.

Career
He started playing football for Takis Oikonomopoulos's academy, in Artemida, Attica, from there, he moved to Paiania (training ground) to be a member of Panathinaikos's youth academies. He promoted to the first team on July 1, 2011 signing a contract which keeps him in Panathinaikos until 2016. He made his debut as a player of the first team on April 23, 2012 at a 4-0 win against Panetolikos F.C., replacing Kotsolis on the 86th minute of the game.

On February 2, 2015, Tabakis was loaned to Eerste Divisie side VVV-Venlo until the end of the season, but he did not make an appearance with the first team before returning. He made two appearances with the Under-21 side, and he was also named to the squad for Venlo's first-round promotion playoff matches against Oss, ahead of Eric Verstappen.

On January 25, 2016, Tambakis transferred from Panathinaikos to Atlanta United FC on a free transfer. He became the first player to be signed by the club, who were set to make their debut in the 2017 season. He was immediately sent on loan to third division with Charleston Battery. Tambakis made 19 appearances for the Battery in 2016, as well as 2 in the postseason, keeping 6 clean sheets. Tambakis was loaned back out to Charleston ahead of the 2017 season, and was recalled multiple times by Atlanta throughout the season. Tambakis made his first teamsheet with Atlanta on March 18, listed ahead of Kyle Reynish as the reserve goalkeeper.

On October 3, 2017, Tambakis made his MLS debut, coming on as a substitute for Reynish, who was sent off for denying Minnesota United forward Abu Danladi a clear goal-scoring opportunity. Entering the game at a 1–0 deficit, Atlanta would score two goals before conceding two more in the 3–2 defeat. Tambakis was in the squad because first-choice goalkeeper Brad Guzan was away at international duty, and second-choice Alec Kann was out injured.

After his option was declined following the 2017 season, Tambakis' rights were traded by Atlanta on December 10, 2017 to Sporting Kansas City along with Kenwyne Jones' rights and a 2021 MLS SuperDraft pick in exchange for a second-round pick in the 2018 MLS SuperDraft, Kevin Oliveira, and Tyler Pasher.

On March 2, 2018, Tambakis joined USL side North Carolina FC.

On March 11, 2021, Tambakis joined New Mexico United.

Career statistics

Honours
Panathinaikos
 Greek Cup: 2014

References

External links

Profile and statistics at Myplayer.gr
Profile at leoforos.gr (Greek)

1992 births
Living people
Greek expatriate footballers
Association football goalkeepers
Atlanta United FC players
Charleston Battery players
Niki Volos F.C. players
Panathinaikos F.C. players
VVV-Venlo players
North Carolina FC players
Super League Greece players
Expatriate footballers in the Netherlands
Expatriate soccer players in the United States
USL Championship players
Major League Soccer players
New Mexico United players
Footballers from Athens
Greek footballers